Devaragunda Venkappa Sadananda Gowda (born 18 March 1953), is an Indian politician who served as the union Minister of Chemicals and Fertilizers of India in the Second Modi ministry from 14 November 2018 to 7 July 2021. He also served as the Minister of Statistics and Programme Implementation of India from 5 July 2016 to 24 May 2019 in the First Modi ministry. He is representing the Bangalore North constituency. He also held Ministry of Railways and other cabinet positions in the First Modi ministry. He also served as the 14th Chief Minister of Karnataka.

He previously served as the Minister of Law and Justice, having been shifted from the Ministry of Railways in the cabinet reshuffle of 5 July 2016. At the end of the previous Lok Sabha, he was the Minister of Statistics and Program Implementation. He then stepped down from his post of Minister of Chemicals and Fertilizers ahead of the cabinet reshuffle in July 2021.

Early life
Sadananda Gowda was born in a Tulu Gowda family of Venkappa Gowda and Kamala in Mandekolu village of Sulya taluk in Karnataka.

Gowda graduated in Science from Saint Philomena College, Puttur and went on to obtain his degree in law at Udupi's Vaikunta Baliga College of Law. He became active in student politics during this period and was elected General Secretary of the Students Union of the Law College. Subsequently, he became the District General Secretary of the Akhil Bharatiya Vidyarthi Parishad.

In 1976, he started practising law at both Sulya and Puttur. He was a public prosecutor for a brief period at Sirsi in the District of Uttara Kannada but resigned from his position to concentrate on his political career.

Sadananda Gowda has served in the Co-operative Movement in Karnataka in various capacities:
 Vice-president of SCDCC Bank, Mangalore
 Director, SKACM Society, Mangalore
 Director, CAMPCO, Mangalore (1991–94)
 President, Mandekolu S.C.Society, Mandekolu, Sullia
 Member, State PLD Bank staff Selection Committee (1989–90)

Sadananda Gowda has worked for the labour movement being the General Secretary of Bharatiya Mazdoor Sangh, Puttur Division and President of Sullia Taluk Auto Rickshaw Drivers and Owners Union.

Political career

He began his political career as a member of the Jan Sangh. He was President of the party's Sulya Assembly segment. After the split of the Janata Party, he became a member of the BJP. Later on, he served the BJP as Dakshina Kannada BJP Yuva Morcha President, Dakshina Kannada BJP Vice-president, State BJP Yuva Morcha Secretary (1983–88), State BJP Secretary (2003–04) and National Secretary of the party (2004).

Karnataka Legislative Assembly
Sadananda Gowda was elected to the Karnataka Legislative Assembly in 1994 and 1999 from the Puttur Assembly seat in Dakshina Kannada. He became Deputy Leader of the Opposition in his second term as MLA. He has served in various committees of the Karnataka State legislature including the Cell for preparing Draft Bill on prohibiting Atrocities on Women, Karnataka, the Committee of Energy, Fuel, and Power, and the Committee for Public Undertaking.  He was nominated as the President of the Public Accounts Committee in 2003.

Lok Sabha
He was elected to the 14th Lok Sabha in 2004 from the Mangalore Lok Sabha seat, defeating Veerappa Moily of the Indian National Congress by a margin of 32,314 votes. In 2009, the party shifted him to the Udupi-Chikmagalur constituency. In parliament, he was on the Committee on Science & Technology, Environment & Forests. In the 14th Lok Sabha, he was a member of the Committee on Commerce. The Government of India had appointed him as Director of Coffee Board during January 2005.

In 2006, Sadananda Gowda was appointed President of Karnataka State BJP. He earned national prominence being the President when BJP won an assembly election for the first time in South India in May 2008.

He was elected to the 15th Lok Sabha from Udupi Chikmagalur Constituency before he became the Chief Minister of Karnataka.

Chief Minister of Karnataka
Sadananda Gowda was chosen as the Chief Minister of Karnataka in August 2011 following the resignation of his mentor B.S. Yeddyurappa in an illegal mining case. Handpicked by Yeddyurappa, he was the second ethnic Tuluva Chief Minister of Karnataka after Veerappa Moily. As Chief Minister, he strived hard to improve the image of his party that had been tarnished due to allegations of corruption. He introduced various schemes such as Sakaala, aimed at providing time-bound services at government offices. But within a few months of becoming Chief Minister, he fell out with Yeddyurappa and was unable to unite the various factions of the party. In July 2012, he was asked to resign to make way for Jagadish Shettar when dissident activities in the party peaked.

After suffering a big loss in the May 2013 elections, BJP elected DV Sadananda Gowda as the opposition leader of legislative council in Karnataka.

On 26 May 2014, Sadananda Gowda was sworn in as a cabinet minister in Prime Minister Narendra Modi's newly elected government. He was put in charge of the Ministry of Railways. He presented his maiden budget on 8 July 2014.

Cabinet minister in Modi's second term government
On 30 May 2019, Sadananda Gowda was sworn in as a cabinet minister in Prime Minister Narendra Modi's second term government. He was put in charge of the Ministry of Chemicals and Fertilizers. He then stepped down from his post of Minister of Chemicals and Fertilizers as directed by the prime minister ahead of the cabinet reshuffle in July 2021.

Accusations
As part of the #Metoo movement, a former BJP Mahila Morcha member accused Gowda in 2018 of inappropriately behaving with her when Gowda was Karnataka's chief minister. She claimed that Gowda would constantly call her and invite her to meet him at his office and have lunch with him. She also claimed that Gowda touched her body parts and attempted to make physical contact with her in a variety of ways. Gowda said that he was not the CM during that period and said "Everyone knows how I am and what I am. I do not want to say anything about this to anyone right now."

Cybersex
A video clip purportedly showing Gowda in a sexually compromising position with an unidentified woman over a video call went viral on social media in September 2021. Gowda said that he has lodged a police complaint and alleged that the “fake, fabricated, concocted” video was “politically motivated” and said that it was created to tarnish his image.

Positions held
 1983–1988 State Secretary, BJP Yuva Morcha Karnataka
 1994–2004 Member, Karnataka Legislative Assembly (two terms)
 1995–1996 Member, Cell for preparing Draft Bill on Prohibiting atrocities on Women, Government of Karnataka
 1999–2004 Deputy Leader of Opposition, Karnataka Legislative Assembly
 1999–2001 Member, Committee on Commerce
 2001–2002 Member, Committee for Energy, Fuel & Power, Karnataka Legislative Assembly
 2002–2003 Member, Public Undertaking Committee, Karnataka Legislative Assembly
 2003–2004 President, Public Accounts Committee, Karnataka Legislative Assembly
 2004 Elected to 14th Lok Sabha
 2006–2010 State President, BJP, Karnataka
 2006–2009 Member, Committee on Commerce
 2006–onwards Member, Sub-committee of the Department Related Parliamentary standing Committee on Commerce for Special Economic Zones
 2009 Elected to 15th Lok Sabha
 2011–2012 Elected as 20th Chief Minister of Karnataka
 2013 Elected as the leader of opposition of Karnataka Legislative Council
 2014 Elected to 16th Lok Sabha from Bangalore North and took oath as Central Railway Minister
 2015–2016 Cabinet Minister-Law & justice
 2016– Minister of Statistics and Programme Implementation
 2019–2021 Elected to 17th Lok Sabha from Bangalore North and took oath as Ministry of Chemicals and Fertilizers

Family
Sadananda Gowda married Datty Sadananda in 1981, with whom he had two sons. In 2003, their elder son Kaushik, a medical student, died in a road accident near Puttur. Their younger son, Karthik Gowda, is a businessman.

References

External links

 Members of Fourteenth Lok Sabha – Parliament of India website
 
 DV Sadananda Gowda
 

|-

|-

|-

|-

|-

|-

|-

1953 births
India MPs 2004–2009
India MPs 2009–2014
India MPs 2014–2019
Chief ministers from Bharatiya Janata Party
Chief Ministers of Karnataka
Leaders of the Opposition in the Karnataka Legislative Council
Living people
Lok Sabha members from Karnataka
People from Dakshina Kannada district
Railway Ministers of India
Law Ministers of India
Members of the Cabinet of India
Bharatiya Janata Party politicians from Karnataka
Narendra Modi ministry
India MPs 2019–present